Ceratandra is a genus of flowering plants from the orchid family, Orchidaceae. It contains 6 known species, all endemic to South Africa.

Ceratandra atrata (L.) T.Durand & Schinz
Ceratandra bicolor Sond. ex Bolus
Ceratandra globosa Lindl.
Ceratandra grandiflora Lindl.
Ceratandra harveyana Lindl.
Ceratandra venosa (Lindl.) Schltr.

See also
 List of Orchidaceae genera

References

 Pridgeon, A.M., Cribb, P.J., Chase, M.A. & Rasmussen, F. eds. (1999). Genera Orchidacearum 1. Oxford Univ. Press.
 Pridgeon, A.M., Cribb, P.J., Chase, M.A. & Rasmussen, F. eds. (2001). Genera Orchidacearum 2. Oxford Univ. Press.
 Pridgeon, A.M., Cribb, P.J., Chase, M.A. & Rasmussen, F. eds. (2003). Genera Orchidacearum 3. Oxford Univ. Press
 Berg Pana, H. 2005. Handbuch der Orchideen-Namen. Dictionary of Orchid Names. Dizionario dei nomi delle orchidee. Ulmer, Stuttgart

Orchids of South Africa
Orchideae genera
Coryciinae